The Trust Golf Women's Scottish Open is a women's professional golf tournament in Scotland on the Ladies European Tour (LET). First played in 1986, it became a regular fixture on the tour schedule in 2010. 

Since 2017 it has been co-sanctioned by the LPGA Tour and played in late July, the week prior to the Women's British Open. A 54-hole event from 2007 through 2016, it returned to a 72-hole event.

Winners

References

External links

Coverage on the Ladies European Tour's official site
Coverage on the LPGA Tour's official site

Scottish Open
Golf tournaments in Scotland
Recurring sporting events established in 1986
1986 establishments in Scotland